Bathocyroe is a genus of ctenophores, the only genus in the family Bathocyroidae.

References 

Lobata
Ctenophore genera